FlightPathTV is a New Zealand documentary television show about aviation. It was created by Malcolm Clement and Fletcher McKenzie and produced by Leading Edge Media. Filmed at locations around the world, FlightPathTV was produced in New Zealand.

Each episode of the thirteen-week series was filmed at air shows and other aviation events, and profiled pilots, aviation destinations and the histories of famous aircraft.

History 
Production of FlightPathTV commenced in March 2007 at the Australian International Airshow in Geelong, Australia. The film crew then traveled to the Wide Bay International Airshow in Queensland, Australia, the Classic Fighters show in Blenheim, New Zealand, the Warbirds Over Wanaka in Wanaka, New Zealand, the Reno Air Races in Reno, Nevada, Pearl Harbor, the Imperial War Museum Duxford in Duxford, England, and the Shuttleworth Collection in Bedfordshire, England.

New Zealand's state broadcaster, Television New Zealand (TVNZ), declined to purchase FlightPathTV. The show was later purchased by Discovery UK, Finland's MTV3 Channel, Denmark's DR HD Channel, Discovery Turbo Asia, Malaysia's Astro Channel and Discovery Turbo (Australia).

The pilot episode of FlightPathTVscreened on Sky TV's Documentary Channel in New Zealand on 2 July 2009, and in Australia. After the screening of the pilot episode, work commenced on the post production of all thirteen episodes.

Ex All Black captain Ritchie McCaw narrated New Zealand edition of FlightPathTV

FlightPathTV first aired in Australia  on 1 January 2011, and also aired in Denmark, Finland, Malaysia and throughout Asia and the UK.

In December 2009 FlightPathTV assisted WWII veteran Ray Richards to reunite with the World War II Corsair FG-D1 he flew in the British Fleet Air Arm.

Aircraft filmed for FlightPathTV

Pilots interviewed on FlightPathTV

References

Documentary television series about aviation